Jhujkadanga is a village in Bhatar CD block in Bardhaman Sadar North subdivision of Purba Bardhaman district in the state of West Bengal, India with total 187 families residing.

History
Census 2011 Jhujkadanga Village Location Code or Village Code 319800.The village of Jhujkadanga is located in the Bhatar tehsil of Burdwan district in West Bengal, India.

Transport 
At around 27 kilometres (16 mi) from Purba Bardhaman, the journey to Jhujkadanga from the town can be made by bus and nearest rail station bhatar.

Population 
Jhujkadanga village, most of the village population is from Schedule Tribe (ST). Schedule Tribe (ST) constitutes 39.65% while Schedule Caste (SC) were 15.79% of total population in Jhujkadanga village.

Population and house data

Healthcare
Nearest Rural Hospital at Bhatar (with 60 beds) is the main medical facility in Bhatar CD block. There are primary health centers..

References 

Villages in Purba Bardhaman district